Sybille Niox-Château (born 19 October 1969) is a former professional tennis player from France.

Biography
Niox-Château, who was born in Paris, is the niece of Italian fashion designer Sergio Tacchini.

She won the Orange Bowl (under 16s) tournament in 1985.

On her grand slam main draw debut at the 1986 French Open she lost in the first round to Nathalie Tauziat, 7–9 in the third set. She went on to appear at all four grand slam tournaments and twice made the second round of the French Open.

One of her best performances on the WTA Tour came at Aix-En-Provence in 1988 when she beat fourth seed Arantxa Sanchez Vicario to make the round of 16. She made one WTA Tour quarter-final, at the 1992 Belgian Open, after which she reached her career best ranking of 94 in the world.

Based in Miami, she is married to former French Davis Cup player Jean-Philippe Fleurian.

ITF finals

Singles (1–2)

Doubles (1–0)

References

External links
 
 

1969 births
Living people
French female tennis players
Sportspeople from Boulogne-Billancourt
Tennis players from Paris
French emigrants to the United States
20th-century French women